John H. Davis (April 5, 1914 – November 3, 1992) was an American child actor, notable for appearing in Hal Roach's Our Gang series. His sister Mildred Davis also acted; she appeared in Roach comedian Harold Lloyd's films as his leading lady. When Lloyd and Mildred were married in 1923, Lloyd pulled Jack out of Our Gang and enrolled him in military school.

Career

Davis first appeared in the fourth Our Gang short, Young Sherlocks. He was known as the little tough boy and was a rival (usually with Mickey) for Mary Kornman's affections. In other shorts he was a just a member of the gang instead of a bully. His screen career ended after 19 shorts in the series when Harold Lloyd and his older sister, Mildred Davis, got married, and Lloyd put the boy into military school. His final appearance was the 1923 short Derby Day. After degrees in anthropology and medicine Davis became a successful physician in the Los Angeles area, specialising in cardiology, and associate professor at the UCLA School of Medicine. He was the grandfather of American actress Carrie Mitchum and actor Bentley Mitchum.

Death
Davis died in 1992 in Santa Monica, California of respiratory failure at the age of 78.

References

External links
  (appears to conflate a number of people with the same name)
 

American male film actors
American male child actors
American cardiologists
Male actors from California
1914 births
1992 deaths
20th-century American male actors
American male comedy actors
Hal Roach Studios actors
Our Gang